Pierre Guilloux (19 October 1901 – 7 September 1937) was a French high jumper and basketball player. He competed at the 1920 and 1924 Summer Olympics and finished seventh in 1924.

References

1901 births
1937 deaths
Basketball players from Paris
French male high jumpers
Olympic athletes of France
Athletes (track and field) at the 1920 Summer Olympics
Athletes (track and field) at the 1924 Summer Olympics
French men's basketball players
Stade Français basketball players
Athletes from Paris
20th-century French people